Rapaninae is a subfamily of predatory sea snails, marine gastropod mollusks in the family Muricidae.

This subfamily was known as Thaidinae until 1993.

Shell description
The shells of species in this subfamily typically do not have a varix, but strong axial sculpture is often present.

Genera
Genera within the subfamily Rapaninae include:
 Acanthais Vermeij & Kool, 1994
 Agnewia Woods, 1878
 Concholepas Lamarck, 1801
 Cymia Mörch, 1860
 Dicathais Iredale, 1936
 Drupa Röding, 1798
 Drupina Dall, 1923 
 † Ecphora Conrad, 1843 
 Indothais Claremont, Vermeij, Williams & Reid, 2013 
 Jopas F. C. Baker, 1895 
 Mancinella Link, 1807
 Menathais Iredale, 1937
 Nassa Röding, 1798
 Neorapana Cooke, 1918
 Neothais Iredale, 1912
 Phycothais Tan, 2003
 Pinaxia Adams & Adams, 1853
 Plicopurpura Cossmann, 1903
 Purpura Bruguière, 1789
 Rapana Schumacher, 1817
 Reishia Kuroda & Habe, 1971
 Ricinella Schumacher, 1817
 Semiricinula Martens, 1903
 Stramonita Schumacher, 1817
 Taurasia Bellardi, 1882
 Thais Röding, 1798
 Thaisella Clench, 1947
 Tribulus Adams & Adams, 1853
 Tylothais Houart, 2017
 Vasula Mörch, 1860
 Vexilla Swainson, 1840
 Genera brought into synonymy 
 Canrena Link, 1807 : synonym of Drupa Röding, 1798
 Conchopatella Herrmannsen, 1847 : synonym of Concholepas Lamarck, 1801
 Conchulus Rafinesque, 1815 : synonym of Concholepas Lamarck, 1801
 Conothais Kuroda, 1930 : synonym of Pinaxia Adams & Adams, 1853
 Cuma Swainson, 1840 : synonym of Cymia Mörch, 1860
 Cumopsis Rovereto, 1899 : synonym of Cymia Mörch, 1860
 Iopas Adams & Adams, 1853 : synonym of Nassa Röding, 1798
 Menathais Iredale, 1937 : synonym of Thais (Thalessa) H. & Adams, 1853
 Microtoma Swainson, 1840 : synonym of Plicopurpura Cossmann, 1903
 Patellipurpura Dall, 1909 : synonym of Plicopurpura Cossmann, 1903
 Pentadactylus Mörch, 1852 : synonym of Drupa Röding, 1798
 Planithais Bayle in Fischer, 1884 : synonym of Tribulus Adams & Adams, 1853
 Provexillum Hedley, 1918 : synonym of Vexilla Swainson, 1840
 Purpura Röding, 1798 : synonym of Trunculariopsis Cossmann, 1921
 Purpurella Dall, 1872 : synonym of Plicopurpura Cossmann, 1903
 Ricinula Lamarck, 1816 : synonym of Drupa Röding, 1798
 Simplicotaurasia Sacco, 1890 : synonym of Taurasia Bellardi, 1882
 Sistrum Montfort, 1810 : synonym of Drupa Röding, 1798

References

External links 
 Miocene Gastropods and Biostratigraphy of the Kern River Area, California; United States Geological Survey Professional Paper 642 
 Rapaninae

 
Muricidae
Taxa named by John Edward Gray